Into the Cauldron is the first extended play release by the Canadian heavy metal band Cauldron.

Track listing

Reception

The Ep received a positive review from Blabbermouth.net with a rating of 7.5/10

Personnel
Jason Decay - vocals, bass guitar
Ian Chains - guitar
Al Chambers - drums

References

2008 albums
Cauldron (band) albums